Beris may refer to:
 Beris, Ardabil
 Beris, Sistan and Baluchestan